The Bari–Taranto railway is an Italian  long railway line, that connects Bari with Gioia del Colle and Taranto.

The line was opened in two stages between 1865 and 1868. On 1 June 1865 the section from Bari to Gioia del Colle opened; the line was further extended on 15 September 1868 to Taranto.

Route upgrade
Work has been carried out to upgrade and double the line since 1994. The first section opened on 31 May 1994 between Acquaviva delle Fonti and Bitetto.

On 14 September 1997 the double track between Gioia del Colle and Palagianello opened. The line was rerouted which saw the closure of stations in Caratini, San Basilio and in Castellaneta town centre.

On 20 December 2004 the line was doubled between Acquaviva delle Fonti and Gioia del Colle, and on 27 May 2007 between Palagiano and Bellavista.

On 22 June 2008 the line was doubled between Grottalupara and Palagiano, which included a new alignment avoiding the centre of Palagianello and the opening of a new station.

On 31 May 2009 the line was doubled between Bari Centrale and Bari Sant'Andrea, which led to the closure of Bari Policlinico station. The southern section of the line was also doubled in 2010.

The final section, between Modugno and Bitetto will be realigned and doubled in 2014.

Usage
The line is used by the following service(s):

High speed services (Frecciabianca) Milan - Parma - Bologna - Ancona - Pescara - Foggia - Bari - Taranto
Intercity services Rome - Foggia - Bari - Taranto
Intercity services Bologna - Rimini - Ancona - Pescara - Foggia - Bari - Taranto
Night train (Intercity Notte) Milan - Ancona - Pescara - Foggia - Bari - Taranto - Brindisi - Lecce
Local services (Treno regionale) Bari - Gioia del Colle - Taranto
Local services (Treno regionale) Gravina in Puglia - Altamura - Gioia del Colle - Taranto

See also 
 List of railway lines in Italy

References

Footnotes

Sources

External links 

Railway lines in Apulia
Railway lines opened in 1865